Daniela Trică (born 21 June 2004) is a retired Romanian artistic gymnast.

Junior career
Trică competed as a junior from 2017 to 2019. She finished fourth with the Romanian junior team at the 2018 European Championships.

Senior career
Trică started her senior career in 2020. In November, she made her senior debut at the Romanian National Championships. She finished seventh in the all-around, won the bronze medal on vault, finished fourth on uneven bars, won silver on balance beam, and won bronze on floor.

In December, Trică competed at the 2020 European Championships, where she helped Romania win the silver medal in the team competition.

Competitive history

References

2004 births
Living people
Romanian female artistic gymnasts
Sportspeople from Bârlad
21st-century Romanian women